Carlos Quintana may refer to:
Carlos Quintana (boxer) (born 1976), Puerto Rican boxer
Carlos Morales Quintana (born 1970), Spanish architect and yachtsman, husband of Princess Alexia of Greece and Denmark
Carlos Quintana (baseball) (born 1965), former baseball player
Carlos Quintana (footballer) (born 1988), Argentine football defender